{{DISPLAYTITLE:C25H30O8}}
The molecular formula C25H30O8 (molar mass: 458.501 g/mol, exact mass: 458.1941 u) may refer to:

 Kadsurin
 Mallotojaponin B

Molecular formulas